Charles Eaton is an English actor known for his stiff upper lip roles in British films of the 1930s and 40s. He appeared in a number of films by the director Maurice Elvey, his most prominent role being that of Captain Royde in Elvey's Who Goes Next? (1938).

Filmography
 D'Ye Ken John Peel (1935)
 Double Alibi (1937)
Who Goes Next? (1938)
The Gaunt Stranger (The Phantom Strikes) (1938)
 Blondes for Danger (1938)
 Lightning Conductor (1938)
Sword of Honour (1938)
Sons of the Sea (1939)
Under Your Hat (1940)

English male film actors